Atlie FC is a South African football (soccer) club based in Benoni, Gauteng. The club currently plays in the National First Division.

Atlie came into existence in 2011 after the club's owners bought out Durban based side Nathi Lions and moved the club to Ekurhuleni.

The team were relegated from the 2011–12 National First Division finishing the season 16th place. Carara Kicks later had eighteen points removed due to fielding an ineligible player and Atlie were moved up to 15th place.

Following the club's relegation, the owner Thabo Mathamela began talks with FC AK with a view to purchasing a controlling stake in the club.

See also
:Category:Atlie F.C. players

References

External links
 
Premier Soccer League

Association football clubs established in 2011
National First Division clubs
Soccer clubs in Gauteng
2011 establishments in South Africa
Ekurhuleni